Lacinipolia vicina is a moth in the family Noctuidae. It is found in Massachusetts, New York, Pennsylvania, Virginia, North Carolina, New Jersey and possibly Indiana.

The length of the forewings is 14–16 mm. The forewings are mottled medium-dark grey. The hindwings are pearly white in males and pearly light grey in females, with a dark grey marginal band that is thin in males (but wider along the veins) and wider in females. Adults have been recorded on wing from April to May and September to October in two generations per year.

The larvae are probably polyphagous ground dwellers.

References

Moths described in 1874
Eriopygini